SN 2006jc was a supernova that was detected on October 9, 2006 in the galaxy UGC 4904, which is about 77 million light-years away in the constellation Lynx. It was first seen by Japanese amateur astronomer Koichi Itagaki, American amateur Tim Puckett and Italian amateur Roberto Gorelli. Two years earlier, the progenitor star produced a supernova impostor that was detected by Itagaki. This outburst was apparently the progenitor star shedding its outer layers. When the star exploded in 2006, the shockwave hit the material blown off in 2004, heating it to millions of degrees and emitting copious amounts of X-rays.

References

External links
 Light curves and spectra on the Open Supernova Catalog

Supernovae
Lynx (constellation)